The 2022 United States Senate elections were held on November 8, 2022, concurrently with the midterm elections at the federal, state and local level, including the 2022 U.S. House of Representatives elections. Regularly scheduled elections were held for 34 of the 100 seats in the U.S. Senate, the winners of which will serve six-year terms in the U.S. Congress from January 3, 2023, to January 3, 2029, starting with the 118th United States Congress. One special election was also held to complete an unexpired term ending January 3, 2027. While pundits considered the Republican Party a slight favorite to gain control of the Senate, the Democratic Party outperformed expectations and expanded the majority they had held since 2021.

Senators are divided into three classes whose terms are staggered so that a different class is elected every two years. All 34 Class 3 Senate seats, last elected in 2016, were up for election in 2022; prior to the elections, Class 3 consisted of 14 Democrats and 20 Republicans. Two special elections were also concurrently held—in California, to fill the final weeks of Vice President Kamala Harris' term, and in Oklahoma, to serve the four remaining years of resigning senator Jim Inhofe's term. Five Republican senators, Richard Shelby (Alabama), Roy Blunt (Missouri), Richard Burr (North Carolina), Rob Portman (Ohio), and Pat Toomey (Pennsylvania), as well as one Democratic senator, Patrick Leahy (Vermont), did not seek re-election; 15 Republicans and 13 Democrats ran for re-election. The winners of these elections began serving in the 118th U.S. Congress. Prior to the elections, Democrats had held a majority in the Senate since January 20, 2021. There were 48 Democratic senators and two independent senators who caucused with them; Harris' tie-breaking vote as vice president gave Democrats control of the chamber.

While Republicans were slightly favored in several competitive races that would determine control of the Senate, a red wave election did not materialize. Democrats gained one seat, in Pennsylvania, where Democrat John Fetterman won the election to succeed retiring Republican Pat Toomey. All incumbents won re-election and all other open seats besides Pennsylvania were held by the same party as the retiring senator. In Georgia, the election advanced to a runoff in which incumbent Raphael Warnock ultimately prevailed. Incumbents Ron Johnson in Wisconsin and Catherine Cortez Masto in Nevada faced particularly close races but were narrowly re-elected. It was the first time since the 1914 U.S. Senate elections that no incumbent lost in a primary or general election.

The better-than-expected performance of Democrats has been attributed to several factors, including the issue of abortion after Dobbs v. Jackson Women's Health Organization, the role of Donald Trump, and extremism or election denialism among Republicans. This was the first time in U.S. history in which multiple Senate races in the same year were contested between two African-American nominees (Georgia and South Carolina). This was the first midterm since 1934 in which the president's party made net gains in both Senate seats and governorships, and the first midterm since 1962 in which Democrats made net gains in the Senate while also holding the presidency.

Partisan composition 
All 34 Class 3 senators were up for election in 2022; prior to Election Day, Class 3 consisted of 14 Democrats and 20 Republicans, including a seat in California held by an interim appointee up for a special election. Additionally, a special election was held for a Class 2 seat in Oklahoma. Of the senators not up for election, 34 were Democrats, 29 were Republicans, and two were independents who caucused with the Senate Democrats.

Elections analysts have noted that, in recent cycles, partisanship in Senate elections has much more closely matched partisanship in presidential elections, and the number of senators representing states won recently by presidential candidates of the opposite party has dwindled. In 2018, Democrats were defending 10 seats in states that Donald Trump won in the 2016 U.S. presidential election, while Republicans held only one seat in a state that Hillary Clinton won in 2016 (Nevada, which Democrats flipped). In contrast, in this cycle Democrats held no seats in states that were won by Trump in the 2020 U.S. presidential election, while Republicans were defending two seats in states Joe Biden won in 2020 (Pennsylvania, which Democrats flipped, and Wisconsin, which Republicans narrowly held).

Summary results 
Democrats had held a majority in the Senate since January 20, 2021, following the party's twin victories in the run-offs for Georgia's regular and special 2020–2021 Senate elections, and the inauguration of Harris as vice president. While many pundits believed Republicans had a strong chance to flip control of the chamber, a red wave election did not materialize. Instead, Democrats performed better than expected in many states, including Pennsylvania, New Hampshire, and Ohio. In Colorado, where some Republican strategists hoped for a competitive race, Michael Bennet won re-election handily, and in New Hampshire, another hopeful Republican target, Maggie Hassan ran ahead of Biden's 2020 margin in the state. Democrats also beat expectations in Rust Belt states; although Tim Ryan lost in Ohio, his performance in the race had a coattail effect that boosted Democrats in competitive House districts in the state, and in Pennsylvania, where John Fetterman handily defeated Trump-endorsee Mehmet Oz, vulnerable House Democrats also benefitted from strong Democratic performance at the top of the ticket. Fetterman improved upon Biden's 2020 results from white voters without a college degree. In Georgia's first round, Raphael Warnock improved upon his margin from 2020–2021 and finished first, before winning by three percentage points in the December runoff.

Democrats' strong performance has been attributed to, among other factors, backlash to abortion-rights restrictions following the U.S. Supreme Court's June 2022 decision in Dobbs v. Jackson Women's Health Organization that overturned Roe v. Wade, negative reaction to Republican extremism and election denialism, better candidate quality among Democrats than Republicans, and youth turnout and vote splitting in key races. Some Republicans blamed Trump for the party's underwhelming showing, citing the underperformance of candidates he endorsed such as Herschel Walker in Georgia and Oz in Pennsylvania. It was a historically good cycle for incumbents; it was the first midterm since the 1914 U.S. Senate elections, following the ratification of the Seventeenth Amendment to the U.S. Constitution, which mandated the popular election of U.S. senators, in which no incumbents were defeated for either a primary or general election. Hassan (New Hampshire), Ron Johnson (Wisconsin), Mark Kelly (Arizona), Catherine Cortez Masto (Nevada), Lisa Murkowski (Alaska), and Warnock (Georgia) faced competitive races but were all re-elected.

For the first time since the 1934 elections, the president's party made net gains in both Senate seats and governorships; it was the first time since the 2006 Senate elections that Democrats made net gains in a midterm year, and also tied with the 1990 elections for the lowest number of party flips at only one seat each. Democrats won full terms in Arizona's and Pennsylvania's Class 3 Senate seats for the first time since the 1962 elections. This was only the second election in U.S. history (after 1934) where the opposition party failed to flip any Senate seats, as well as the most recent election in which the president's party gained Senate seats and simultaneously lost House seats in a midterm, along with 1914, 1962, 1970, and 2018; it was the first midterm in which Democrats did so since 1962. This election cycle was also the closest in any Senate election since at least the beginning of World War II.

Seats

Votes

Closest races 
Races that had a margin of victory under 10%:

Change in composition 
Each block represents one of the one hundred seats in the U.S. Senate. "D" is a Democratic senator, "I" is an Independent senator, and "R" is a Republican senator. They are arranged so the parties are separated and a majority is clear by crossing the middle.

Before the elections 
Each block indicates an incumbent senator's actions going into the election.

After the elections

Beginning of the first session

Final pre-election predictions 
Several sites and individuals publish predictions of competitive seats. These predictions look at factors such as the strength of the incumbent (if the incumbent is running for re-election) and the other candidates and the state's partisan lean (reflected in part by the state's Cook Partisan Voting Index rating). The predictions assign ratings to each seat, indicating the predicted advantage that a party had in winning that seat. Most election predictors use:
 "tossup" / "battleground": no advantage 
 "tilt" (used by some predictors): minimal, smallest advantage
 "lean": slight advantage
 "likely": significant, but surmountable, advantage
 "safe" or "solid": near-certain chance of victory

<div style="overflow-x:auto;>
{| class="wikitable sortable"
|- style="vertical-align:bottom"
! colspan=2 | Constituency
! colspan=2 | Incumbent
! colspan="12" | 2022 election ratings
|- style="vertical-align:bottom"
! State
! PVI
! Senator
! data-sort-type="number"| Lastelection
! Cook
! IE
! Sabato
! CBS
! Politico
! RCP
! Fox
! DDHQ
! 538
! Econ.
! Result
|-
! Alabama
|  data-sort-value="15" | R+15
|  data-sort-value="Shelby, Richard" | Richard Shelby
|  data-sort-value="64.0" | 64.0% R
| 
 | 
| 
| 
| 
| 
| 
| 
| 
| 
|  data-sort-value="66.8" | Britt66.8% R
|-
! Alaska
|  data-sort-value="8" | R+8
|  data-sort-value="Murkowski, Lisa" | Lisa Murkowski
|  data-sort-value="44.4" | 44.4% R
| 
 | 
| 
| 
| 
| 
| 
| 
| 
| 
|  data-sort-value="53.7" | Murkowski53.7% R
|-
! Arizona
|  data-sort-value="2" | R+2
|  data-sort-value="Kelly, Mark" | Mark Kelly
|  data-sort-value="-51.2" | 51.2% D
| 
 | 
| 
| 
| 
| 
| 
| 
| 
| 
|  data-sort-value="-51.4" | Kelly51.4% D
|-
! Arkansas
|  data-sort-value="16" | R+16
|  data-sort-value="Boozman, John" | John Boozman
|  data-sort-value="59.8" | 59.8% R
| 
 | 
| 
| 
| 
| 
| 
| 
| 
| 
|  data-sort-value="65.7" | Boozman65.7% R
|-
! California
|  data-sort-value="-13" | D+13
|  data-sort-value="Padilla, Alex" | Alex Padilla
|  data-sort-value="0" | Appointed
| 
 | 
| 
| 
| 
| 
| 
| 
| 
| 
|  data-sort-value="-61.1" | Padilla61.1% D
|-
! Colorado
|  data-sort-value="-4" | D+4
|  data-sort-value="Bennet, Michael" | Michael Bennet
|  data-sort-value="-50.0" | 50.0% D
| 
 | 
| 
| 
| 
| 
| 
| 
| 
| 
|  data-sort-value="-55.9" | Bennet55.9% D
|-
! Connecticut
|  data-sort-value="-7" | D+7
|  data-sort-value="Blumenthal, Richard" | Richard Blumenthal
|  data-sort-value="-63.2" | 63.2% D
| 
 | 
| 
| 
| 
| 
| 
| 
| 
| 
|  data-sort-value="-57.5" | Blumenthal57.5% D
|-
! Florida
|  data-sort-value="3" | R+3
|  data-sort-value="Rubio, Marco" | Marco Rubio
|  data-sort-value="52.0" | 52.0% R
| 
 | 
| 
| 
| 
| 
| 
| 
| 
| 
|  data-sort-value="57.7" | Rubio57.7% R
|-
! Georgia
|  data-sort-value="3" | R+3
|  data-sort-value="Warnock, Raphael" | Raphael Warnock
|  data-sort-value="-51.0" | 51.0% D
| 
 | 
| 
| 
| 
| 
| 
| 
| 
| 
|  data-sort-value="-51.4" | Warnock51.4% D
|-
! Hawaii
|  data-sort-value="-14" | D+14
|  data-sort-value="Schatz, Brian" | Brian Schatz
|  data-sort-value="-73.6" | 73.6% D
| 
 | 
| 
| 
| 
| 
| 
| 
| 
| 
|  data-sort-value="-71.2" | Schatz71.2% D
|-
! Idaho
|  data-sort-value="18" | R+18
|  data-sort-value="Crapo, Mike" | Mike Crapo
|  data-sort-value="66.1" | 66.1% R
| 
 | 
| 
| 
| 
| 
| 
| 
| 
| 
|  data-sort-value="60.7" | Crapo60.7% R
|-
! Illinois
|  data-sort-value="-7" | D+7
|  data-sort-value="Duckworth, Tammy" | Tammy Duckworth
|  data-sort-value="-54.9" | 54.9% D
| 
 | 
| 
| 
| 
| 
| 
| 
| 
| 
|  data-sort-value="-56.8" | Duckworth56.8% D
|-
! Indiana
|  data-sort-value="11" | R+11
|  data-sort-value="Young, Todd" | Todd Young
|  data-sort-value="52.1" | 52.1% R
| 
 | 
| 
| 
| 
| 
| 
| 
| 
| 
|  data-sort-value="58.6" | Young58.6% R
|-
! Iowa
|  data-sort-value="6" | R+6
|  data-sort-value="Grassley, Chuck" | Chuck Grassley
|  data-sort-value="60.1" | 60.1% R
| 
 | 
| 
| 
| 
| 
| 
| 
| 
| 
|  data-sort-value="56.1" | Grassley56.1% R
|-
! Kansas
|  data-sort-value="10" | R+10
|  data-sort-value="Moran, Jerry" | Jerry Moran
|  data-sort-value="62.2" | 62.2% R
| 
 | 
| 
| 
| 
| 
| 
| 
| 
| 
|  data-sort-value="60.0" | Moran60.0% R
|-
! Kentucky
|  data-sort-value="16" | R+16
|  data-sort-value="Paul, Rand" | Rand Paul
|  data-sort-value="57.3" | 57.3% R
| 
 | 
| 
| 
| 
| 
| 
| 
| 
| 
|  data-sort-value="61.8" | Paul61.8% R
|-
! Louisiana
|  data-sort-value="12" | R+12
|  data-sort-value="Kennedy, John" | John Kennedy
|  data-sort-value="60.7" | 60.7% R
| 
 | 
| 
| 
| 
| 
| 
| 
| 
| 
|  data-sort-value="61.6" | Kennedy61.6% R
|-
! Maryland
|  data-sort-value="-14" | D+14
|  data-sort-value="Van Hollen, Chris" | Chris Van Hollen
|  data-sort-value="-60.9" | 60.9% D
| 
 | 
| 
| 
| 
| 
| 
| 
| 
| 
|  data-sort-value="-65.8" | Van Hollen65.8% D
|-
! Missouri
|  data-sort-value="10" | R+10
|  data-sort-value="Blunt, Roy" | Roy Blunt
|  data-sort-value="49.2" | 49.2% R
| 
 | 
| 
| 
| 
| 
| 
| 
| 
| 
|  data-sort-value="55.4" | Schmitt55.4% R
|-
! Nevada
|  data-sort-value="1" | R+1
|  data-sort-value="Cortez Masto, Catherine" | Catherine Cortez Masto
|  data-sort-value="-47.1" | 47.1% D
| 
 | 
| 
| 
| 
| 
| 
| 
| 
| 
|  data-sort-value="-48.8" | Cortez Masto48.8% D
|-
! New Hampshire
|  data-sort-value="-1" | D+1
|  data-sort-value="Hassan, Maggie" | Maggie Hassan
|  data-sort-value="-48.0" | 48.0% D
| 
 | 
| 
| 
| 
| 
| 
| 
| 
| 
|  data-sort-value="-53.5" | Hassan53.5% D
|-
! New York
|  data-sort-value="-10" | D+10
|  data-sort-value="Schumer, Chuck" | Chuck Schumer
|  data-sort-value="-70.6" | 70.6% D
| 
 | 
| 
| 
| 
| 
| 
| 
| 
| 
|  data-sort-value="-56.8" | Schumer56.8% D
|-
! North Carolina
|  data-sort-value="3" | R+3
|  data-sort-value="Burr, Richard" | Richard Burr
|  data-sort-value="51.1" | 51.1% R
| 
 | 
| 
| 
| 
| 
| 
| 
| 
| 
|  data-sort-value="50.5" | Budd50.5% R
|-
! North Dakota
|  data-sort-value="20" | R+20
|  data-sort-value="Hoeven, John" | John Hoeven
|  data-sort-value="78.5" | 78.5% R
| 
 | 
| 
| 
| 
| 
| 
| 
| 
| 
|  data-sort-value="56.4" | Hoeven56.4% R
|-
! Ohio
|  data-sort-value="6" | R+6
|  data-sort-value="Portman, Rob" | Rob Portman
|  data-sort-value="58.0" | 58.0% R
| 
 | 
| 
| 
| 
| 
| 
| 
| 
| 
|  data-sort-value="53.0" | Vance53.0% R
|-
! Oklahoma
|  data-sort-value="20" | R+20
|  data-sort-value="Lankford, James" | James Lankford
|  data-sort-value="67.7" | 67.7% R
| 
 | 
| 
| 
| 
| 
| 
| 
| 
| 
|  data-sort-value="64.3" | Lankford64.3% R
|-
! Oklahoma
|  data-sort-value="20" | R+20
|  data-sort-value="Inhofe, Jim" | Jim Inhofe
|  data-sort-value="62.9" | 62.9% R
| 
 | 
| 
| 
| 
| 
| 
| 
| 
| 
|  data-sort-value="61.8" | Mullin61.8% R
|-
! Oregon
|  data-sort-value="-6" | D+6
|  data-sort-value="Wyden, Ron" | Ron Wyden
|  data-sort-value="-56.6" | 56.6% D
| 
 | 
| 
| 
| 
| 
| 
| 
| 
| 
|  data-sort-value="-55.8" | Wyden55.8% D
|-
! Pennsylvania
|  data-sort-value="2" | R+2
|  data-sort-value="Toomey, Pat" | Pat Toomey
|  data-sort-value="48.8" | 48.8% R
| 
 | 
| 
| 
| 
| 
| 
| 
| 
| 
|  data-sort-value="-51.2" | Fetterman51.2% D 
|-
! South Carolina
|  data-sort-value="8" | R+8
|  data-sort-value="Scott, Tim" | Tim Scott
|  data-sort-value="60.6" | 60.6% R
| 
 | 
| 
| 
| 
| 
| 
| 
| 
| 
|  data-sort-value="62.9" | Scott62.9% R
|-
! South Dakota
|  data-sort-value="16" | R+16
|  data-sort-value="Thune, John" | John Thune
|  data-sort-value="71.8" | 71.8% R
| 
 | 
| 
| 
| 
| 
| 
| 
| 
| 
|  data-sort-value="69.6" | Thune69.6% R
|-
! Utah
|  data-sort-value="13" | R+13
|  data-sort-value="Lee, Mike" | Mike Lee
|  data-sort-value="68.2" | 68.2% R
| 
 | 
| 
| 
| 
| 
| 
| 
| 
| 
|  data-sort-value="53.2" | Lee53.2% R
|-
! Vermont
|  data-sort-value="-16" | D+16
|  data-sort-value="Leahy, Patrick" | Patrick Leahy
|  data-sort-value="-61.3" | 61.3% D
| 
 | 
| 
| 
| 
| 
| 
| 
| 
| 
|  data-sort-value="-67.3" | Welch67.3% D
|-
! Washington
|  data-sort-value="-8" | D+8
|  data-sort-value="Murray, Patty" | Patty Murray
|  data-sort-value="-58.8" | 58.8% D
| 
 | 
| 
| 
| 
| 
| 
| 
| 
| 
|  data-sort-value="-57.1" | Murray57.1% D
|-
! Wisconsin
|  data-sort-value="2" | R+2
|  data-sort-value="Johnson, Ron" | Ron Johnson
|  data-sort-value="50.2" | 50.2% R
| 
 | 
| 
| 
| 
| 
| 
| 
| 
| 
|  data-sort-value="50.4" | Johnson50.4% R
|-
! colspan=4 class="unsortable" | Overall
| class="unsortable" | D – 47R – 494 tossups
| class="unsortable" | D – 48R – 493 tossups
| class="unsortable" | D – 49R – 510 tossups
| class="unsortable" | D – 47R – 485 tossups
| class="unsortable" | D – 47R – 485 tossups
| class="unsortable" | D – 44R – 488 tossups
| class="unsortable" | D – 47R – 494 tossups
| class="unsortable" | D – 48R – 493 tossups
| class="unsortable" | D – 48R – 502 tossups
| class="unsortable" | D – 48R – 502 tossups
| class="unsortable" |  Results:D – 51R – 49

Gains and holds 
One Democrat and five Republicans retired instead of seeking re-election.

Retirements

Resignations
One Republican resigned two years into his six-year term.

Race summary

Special elections during the preceding Congress 
In each special election, the winner's term can begin immediately after their election is certified by their state's government. In cases where a resignation has been previously announced, the new senator's term can begin once the previous senator's resignation is submitted officially.

Elections are sorted by date, then state.

Elections leading to the next Congress 
In these general elections, the winners will be elected for the term beginning January 3, 2023.

Alabama

Six-term Republican Richard Shelby was re-elected in 2016 with 64% of the vote. On February 8, 2021, Shelby announced that he would not seek re-election to a seventh term. Katie Britt, Shelby's former chief of staff, and Mo Brooks, a six-term U.S. representative, finished ahead of businesswoman Karla DuPriest, former Army pilot and author Michael Durant, and author Jake Schafer in the first round of the Republican primary election, with Britt going on to defeat Brooks in a runoff. Perennial candidate Will Boyd defeated former Brighton mayor Brandaun Dean and Lanny Jackson in the Democratic primary. Britt won the Senate election, becoming the first woman elected to the United States Senate from Alabama.

Alaska 

Three-term Republican Lisa Murkowski was re-elected in 2016 with 44.4% of the vote. Alaska voters passed a ballot initiative in 2020 that adopted a new top-four ranked-choice voting system: all candidates compete in a nonpartisan blanket primary, the top four candidates advance to the general election, and the winner is determined by instant-runoff voting using ranked-choice ballots. On March 30, following the Alaska Republican Party's decision to censure senator Murkowski, former Alaska Department of Administration commissioner Kelly Tshibaka announced her campaign against Murkowski, later receiving Donald Trump's endorsement. Republican governor Mike Dunleavy, who was considered another potential challenger to Murkowski, instead ran for re-election.

Murkowski, Tshibaka, Republican Buzz Kelley, and Democrat Pat Chesbro advanced to the general election. Kelley suspended his campaign in September and endorsed Tshibaka, although his name remained on the ballot.

Murkowski received a slight plurality of the first-choice votes and a majority of all votes following the ranked choice tabulation, winning re-election to a fourth full term.

Arizona 

Incumbent Democrat Mark Kelly took office on December 2, 2020, after winning a special election with 51.2% of the vote.

Six-term senator and 2008 Republican presidential nominee John McCain was re-elected to this seat in 2016. He died on August 25, 2018, and former U.S. senator Jon Kyl was appointed to replace him. Kyl resigned at the end of 2018 and U.S. representative Martha McSally was appointed to replace him. Kelly defeated McSally in the 2020 special election.

In the Republican primary, Blake Masters, the chairman of the Thiel Foundation, defeated Jim Lamon, chair of the solar power company Depcom, and Arizona Attorney General Mark Brnovich.

Kelly defeated Masters, winning election to his first full term.

Arkansas 

Two-term Republican John Boozman was re-elected in 2016 with 59.8% of the vote. Boozman ran for a third term.

Boozman defeated former NFL player and U.S. Army veteran Jake Bequette, gun range owner and 2018 gubernatorial candidate Jan Morgan, and pastor Heath Loftis in the Republican primary. A fourth challenger, corporate analyst Michael Deel withdrew prior to the primary election citing a lack of viability.

Natalie James, a real estate broker from Little Rock, defeated Dan Whitfield, who attempted to run as an independent for Arkansas' other U.S. Senate seat in 2020 but failed to meet the ballot access requirements, and former Pine Bluff City alderman Jack Foster in the Democratic primary.

Boozman defeated James, winning re-election to a third term.

California 

Incumbent Democrat Alex Padilla took office on January 20, 2021. He was appointed by Governor Gavin Newsom following the resignation of incumbent Democrat Kamala Harris on January 18, 2021, in advance of her swearing-in as Vice President of the United States.

Due to a rule change, there were two ballot items for the same seat: a general election, to elect a Class 3 senator to a full term beginning with the 118th United States Congress, sworn in on January 3, 2023, and a special election, to fill that seat for the final weeks of the 117th Congress. Padilla ran in both races, as did the Republican nominee, attorney Mark Meuser. Padilla defeated Meuser in both races, winning election to his first full term.

Colorado 

Two-term Democrat Michael Bennet took office on January 21, 2009, after being appointed by then Colorado governor Bill Ritter to replace outgoing Democrat Ken Salazar, who was nominated by President Barack Obama to serve as United States secretary of the interior. He had narrowly won reelection bids, in 2010 to his first full term, with 48.08% of the vote, and, in 2016 to his second, with 49.97% of the vote.

In the Republican primary, construction company owner Joe O'Dea defeated state representative Ron Hanks.

Bennet defeated O'Dea, winning election to his third full term.

Connecticut 

Two-term Democrat Richard Blumenthal was re-elected in 2016 with 63.2% of the vote.

Former state House minority leader Themis Klarides ran for the Republican nomination, but lost to commodities trader Leora Levy.

Florida 

Two-term Republican Marco Rubio was re-elected in 2016 with 52% of the vote. He announced on November 9, 2020, via Facebook, that he was running for re-election.

U.S. representative Val Demings was the Democratic nominee.

Ivanka Trump, daughter and former senior advisor to former president Donald Trump, was seen as a potential candidate to challenge Rubio for the Republican nomination. However, on February 18, 2021, it was confirmed that she would not seek the nomination.

Rubio defeated Demings, winning re-election to a third term.

Georgia 

Incumbent Democrat Raphael Warnock won the 2020–2021 special election against incumbent Republican Kelly Loeffler to fill the remainder of former senator Johnny Isakson's term. Isakson resigned at the end of 2019 due to health problems, and Loeffler was appointed by Governor Brian Kemp following Isakson's resignation. No candidate in the open election on November 3 received the 50% required by Georgia law to avoid a run-off, a type of election colloquially known as a "jungle primary"—Warnock received just 32.9% of the vote—and so, a run-off election between Warnock and Loeffler was held on January 5, 2021, which Warnock won with 51% of the vote.

Former Republican senator David Perdue, who narrowly lost his race to Democratic challenger Jon Ossoff in 2021, and former U.S. representative Doug Collins both considered challenging Warnock, but eventually announced they were not running.

Former NFL player Herschel Walker, who had been endorsed by former president Donald Trump, defeated banking executive Latham Saddler and others in the Republican primary.

In the general election, no candidate received a majority of the vote. Warnock defeated Walker in a runoff between the top-two finishers on December 6.

Hawaii 

One-term Democrat Brian Schatz was appointed to the Senate in 2012, following the death of incumbent Daniel Inouye. He won a special election to finish Inouye's term in 2014, and won his first full term in 2016 with 73.6% of the vote. Republican state representative Bob McDermott challenged Schatz.

Idaho 

Four-term Republican Mike Crapo was re-elected in 2016 with 66.1% of the vote. He is running for re-election to a fifth term. Democrat David Roth faced Crapo in the general election after defeating Ben Pursley in the primary.

Illinois 

One-term Democrat Tammy Duckworth was elected in 2016 with 54.9% of the vote. She defeated Republican attorney Kathy Salvi in the general election.

Indiana 

One-term Republican Todd Young was elected in 2016 with 52.1% of the vote. He announced on March 2, 2021, that he was running for re-election. Hammond mayor Thomas McDermott Jr. won the Democratic nomination. James Sceniak, a behavior therapist, was the Libertarian candidate.

Young defeated McDermott, winning re-election to a second term.

Iowa 

Seven-term Republican Chuck Grassley was re-elected in 2016 with 60.1% of the vote. He is seeking re-election to an eighth term.

In the Republican primary, Grassley defeated state senator Jim Carlin.

Retired admiral and former aide to U.S. senator Ted Kennedy, Michael Franken, was the Democratic nominee. Franken defeated former U.S. representative Abby Finkenauer in the primary in what was seen as a major upset.

Grassley defeated Franken, winning re-election to a eighth term.

Kansas 

Two-term Republican Jerry Moran was re-elected in 2016 with 62.2% of the vote. He announced that he was seeking re-election in 2020. Democratic United Methodist pastor and former Kansas City Mayor Mark Holland challenged Moran.

Kentucky 

Two-term Republican Rand Paul was re-elected in 2016 with 57.3% of the vote. He sought re-election to a third term.

Former Democratic state Representative and 2020 runner-up in the Democratic U.S. Senate primary Charles Booker won the Democratic primary.

Louisiana 

One-term Republican John Kennedy was elected in 2016 with 60.6% of the vote and ran for a second term. Civil rights activist Gary Chambers and U.S. Navy veteran Luke Mixon ran as Democrats.

Maryland 

One-term Democrat Chris Van Hollen was elected in 2016 with 60.9% of the vote, and ran for a second term.

Despite previously indicating that he had no interest in pursuing the Republican nomination for the U.S. Senate, incumbent Governor Larry Hogan, who was term-limited and scheduled to leave office in 2023, told conservative talk radio host Hugh Hewitt in October 2021 that he was considering challenging Van Hollen. Hogan ultimately decided not to challenge Van Hollen on February 8, 2022.

Van Hollen and construction company owner Chris Chaffee won their respective primaries on July 19.

Missouri 

Two-term Republican Roy Blunt was re-elected in 2016 with 49.2% of the vote. He did not seek re-election.

State attorney general Eric Schmitt defeated former governor Eric Greitens, and U.S. representatives Vicky Hartzler and Billy Long in the Republican primary.

Anheuser-Busch heiress Trudy Busch Valentine defeated Marine veteran Lucas Kunce in the Democratic primary.

Nevada 

One-term Democrat Catherine Cortez Masto was elected in 2016 with 47.1% of the vote. She ran for re-election.

Former state attorney general Adam Laxalt ran against Cortez Masto for the seat once held by his maternal grandfather Paul Laxalt.

New Hampshire 

One-term Democrat Maggie Hassan was elected in 2016 with 48% of the vote. She ran for re-election.

New Hampshire governor Chris Sununu, who was re-elected in 2020 with 65.2% of the vote, declined to run.

U.S. Army brigadier general Don Bolduc narrowly defeated state senator Chuck Morse, former Londonderry town manager Kevin Smith, and others in the Republican primary.

New York 

Incumbent four-term Democratic Party Senator Chuck Schumer, who had served as Senate Majority Leader since 2021 and had held New York's Class 3 Senate seat since defeating Republican Party incumbent Al D'Amato in 1998, ran for a fifth term. Republican Party challenger Joe Pinion was the first black Senate nominee of any major party in New York history. The filing deadline for the June primary was April 7, 2022. Schumer became the longest-serving U.S. senator in the state's history once his fifth term began.

Though Schumer was comfortably re-elected, he lost significant support on Long Island and Upstate New York compared to his last election in 2016. Pinion flipped the more conservative counties that Schumer had won in his previous runs, as well as some Democratic leaning counties such as Nassau, Saratoga, Broome, Clinton, and Essex. However, Schumer's lead was large enough in New York City that it was called by most media outlets the moment the polls closed.

Despite Democrats overperforming expectations on a national level during this cycle, this race was the most competitive in Schumer's Senate career since his first election in 1998, when he won by 10.5%.

North Carolina 

Three-term Republican Richard Burr was re-elected in 2016 with 51.0% of the vote. Burr pledged to retire in 2023.
 
Veteran and senior fellow at the Center for International Policy, Mathew Hoh ran for senate with the Green Party.

Lara Trump, daughter-in-law of former president Donald Trump, and Lieutenant Governor Mark Robinson briefly considered running for U.S. Senate, but both decided not to run.

U.S. representative Ted Budd, who was endorsed by former president Donald Trump, easily defeated former governor Pat McCrory in the Republican primary.

Former chief justice of the state Supreme Court Cheri Beasley easily defeated Beaufort mayor Rett Newton in the Democratic primary.

North Dakota 

Two-term Republican John Hoeven was re-elected in 2016 with 78.5% of the vote. On February 4, 2021, Hoeven campaign spokesman Dan Larson indicated that Hoeven was running for re-election in 2022. University of Jamestown engineering professor Katrina Christiansen defeated businessman Michael Steele in the Democratic primary election. Former state representative Rick Becker challenged Hoeven in the Republican primary but withdrew after losing the convention.

Hoeven and Christiansen won their respective primaries on June 14.

Ohio 

Two-term Republican Rob Portman was re-elected in 2016 with 58% of the vote. On January 25, 2021, he announced that he would not be running for re-election.

Venture capitalist and author J. D. Vance was nominated in a crowded and competitive Republican primary, defeating USMCR veteran and former state treasurer Josh Mandel, state senator Matt Dolan, investment banker Mike Gibbons, and former Ohio Republican Party chair Jane Timken, among others. Vance was endorsed by former president Donald Trump late in the primary.

U.S. representative and 2020 presidential candidate, Tim Ryan, was the Democratic nominee.

Oklahoma 

There were two elections in Oklahoma due to the resignation of Jim Inhofe.

Oklahoma (regular) 

One-term Republican James Lankford won the 2014 special election to serve the remainder of former U.S. senator Tom Coburn's term. Lankford won election to his first full term in 2016 with 67.7% of the vote. He announced that he would be running for re-election on April 6, 2021. Two Democratic candidates were competing in the runoff Democratic primary election.

Jackson Lahmeyer, the pastor for Sheridan Church and former Oklahoma State coordinator for the Billy Graham Evangelistic Association, challenged Lankford in the Republican primary.

Oklahoma (special) 

Five-term incumbent Republican Jim Inhofe had been re-elected with 63% of the vote in 2020 and was not scheduled to be up for election again until 2026. However, Inhofe announced his intention to resign at the end of the 117th U.S. Congress. A special election to fill his seat took place in November 2022, concurrent with the other Senate elections. U.S. representative Markwayne Mullin defeated state House speaker T. W. Shannon in the runoff Republican primary election. Mullin and Shannon defeated Inhofe's chief of staff Luke Holland and others in the initial Republican primary election. Former U.S. representative Kendra Horn was the Democratic nominee, being her party's only candidate.

Markwayne Mullin, a member of the Cherokee Nation, became the first Native American to serve in the U.S. Senate since fellow Republican Ben Nighthorse Campbell retired from Congress in 2005.

Oregon 

Incumbent Democratic U.S. Senator Ron Wyden, who was first elected in a 1996 special election, ran for a fifth full term. Jo Rae Perkins, who unsuccessfully ran for Oregon's other Senate seat in 2020, won the Republican primary with 33.3% of the vote. The four candidates filing with the Oregon Secretary of State for this election included Chris Henry of the Oregon Progressive Party and Dan Pulju of the Pacific Green Party.

Wyden ultimately won the election with 55.8% of the statewide vote. This is the first victory of Wyden’s since 1996 where none of the following counties went Democratic in a Senate Class III election: Gilliam, Jackson, Marion, Polk, Wasco and Yamhill. It’s also the first time Columbia County supported the Republican nominee over Wyden.

Pennsylvania 

Two-term Republican Pat Toomey was re-elected in 2016 with 48.8% of the vote. On October 5, 2020, Toomey announced that he would retire at the end of his term.

Lieutenant Governor John Fetterman easily defeated state representative Malcolm Kenyatta and U.S. representative Conor Lamb in the Democratic primary.

Mehmet Oz, host of The Dr. Oz Show and cardiothoracic surgeon, narrowly defeated business executive David McCormick, 2018 U.S. Senate candidate Jeff Bartos, 2018 candidate for  Sean Gale, political commentator Kathy Barnette, and former U.S. ambassador to Denmark Carla Sands, after a bitter Republican primary.

South Carolina 

One-term Republican Tim Scott was appointed in 2013 and won election to his first full term in 2016 with 60.6% of the vote. He said that while he ran for re-election in 2022, it would be his last time. In the Democratic primary, state representative Krystle Matthews defeated author and activist Catherine Fleming Bruce in a runoff. Angela Geter, chairwoman of the Spartanburg County Democratic Party, also ran in the primary.

South Dakota 

Three-term Republican and U.S. Senate minority whip John Thune was re-elected in 2016 with 71.8% of the vote and ran for reelection to a fourth term. Thune had been subject to some backlash from former President Trump and his supporters in the state of South Dakota, leading to speculation of a potential primary challenge. He defeated Bruce Whalen, an Oglala Sioux tribal administrator and former chair of the Oglala Lakota County Republican Party in the Republican primary.

The Democratic candidate was author, navy veteran, and assistant professor of criminal justice at Northern State University, Brian Bengs, who won the primary unopposed.

Utah 

Two-term Republican Mike Lee was re-elected in 2016 with 68.2% of the vote. He defeated former state representative Becky Edwards as well as businessman and political advisor Ally Isom in the Republican primary.

The Utah Democratic Party declined to field their own candidate against Lee and instead endorsed independent Evan McMullin, a political activist, former Republican, former CIA operations officer, and 2016 presidential candidate.

Incumbent Senator Mike Lee won re-election to a third term, defeating Independent candidate Evan McMullin. This was the first Senate election in Utah's history in which there was no Democratic nominee. Lee's performance was the worst for a Republican in a Utah U.S. Senate election since 1974, while McMullin's was the best ever for an Independent in a Utah U.S. Senate race and the best for a non-Republican since 1976.

Vermont 

The most senior senator, an eight-term Democrat and president pro tempore Patrick Leahy, was re-elected in 2016 with 61.3% of the vote. On November 15, 2021, Leahy announced that he would not seek re-election to a ninth term.

Vermont's at-large representative, Democrat Peter Welch, ran to succeed Leahy.

Former military officer Gerald Malloy was the Republican nominee, having narrowly defeated former United States attorney for the District of Vermont Christina Nolan in the primary.

Washington 

In 2022, the Washington state blanket primary had 18 candidates on the ballot for the U.S. Senate seat. Democrat Patty Murray ran for re-election to a sixth term. She won her place on the general election ballot with 52.2% of the vote.
Republican nurse Tiffany Smiley also ran for the Senate seat, and advanced to the general election after coming in second in the blanket primary with 33.7% of the vote.

Murray defeated Smiley and won re-election to a sixth term in the November 8, 2022 election, receiving 57% of the vote.  Smiley conceded the following day.

Wisconsin 

Incumbent Republican Senator Ron Johnson won re-election to a third term, defeating the Democratic nominee, Lieutenant Governor Mandela Barnes.

In 2016, Johnson pledged to serve only two terms but reversed this decision in 2022. The race was one of the most competitive of the cycle, after considerable Democratic success in recent statewide elections: in 2018, when Democrats won every statewide contest on the ballot, including the state's other Senate seat; and 2020, in which Democrat Joe Biden narrowly carried the state.

Notes

References